Gigi Hewitt (born July 6, 1972) is an equestrian who represents the United States Virgin Islands. She competed in the individual jumping event at the 2000 Summer Olympics.

References

External links
 

1972 births
Living people
United States Virgin Islands female equestrians
Olympic equestrians of the United States Virgin Islands
Equestrians at the 2000 Summer Olympics
Equestrians at the 1999 Pan American Games
People from Saint Thomas, U.S. Virgin Islands
Pan American Games competitors for the United States Virgin Islands
21st-century American women